Leiden Studies in Indo-European is an academic book series on Indo-European studies.
The series was founded in 1991 and is published by Rodopi.

Editors
 R.S.P. Beekes
 A. Lubotsky
 J.J.S. Weitenberg

Volumes
Volumes include:
 #20. The Germanic loanwords in Proto-Slavic. By Saskia Pronk-Tiethoff.  E-
 #19. The Vedic -ya-presents. Passives and intransitivity in Old Indo-Aryan., by Leonid Kulikov.  E-
 #18. The Proto-Germanic n-stems., by Guus Kroonen.  E-
 #17. Studies in Germanic, Indo-European and Indo-Uralic, by Frederik Kortlandt.  
 #16. Baltica & Balto-Slavica, by Frederik Kortlandt. 
 #15. Variation and Change in Tocharian B, by Michaël Peyrot. 
 #14. Italo-Celtic Origins and Prehistoric Development of the Irish Language, by Frederik Kortlandt. 
 #13. Le désidératif en védique, by François Heenen.  
 #12. The Avestan Vowels, by Michiel de Vaan.  
 #11. Description of the Greek Individual Verbal Systems, by Henri M.F.M. van de Laar. 
 #10. A Dictionary of Tocharian B. Revised and Greatly Enlarged., by Douglas Q. Adams.  E-BOOK 978-94-012-0936-6

External links
 Leiden Studies in Indo-European on the publishers website
 Department of Comparative Indo-European Linguistics at Leiden University

Indo-European studies
Linguistics books
Rodopi (publisher) books